Yangmeikeng is a valley and scenic spot facing Daya Bay, on Dapeng Peninsula, Dapeng New District, Shenzhen, China. Yangmeikeng is particularly famous for its natural beaches. Many chose to rent bikes to ride along the seashore.

Neighbouring attractions
Qiniangshan
Dapeng Fortress

References

Dapeng New District
Tourist attractions in Shenzhen